Dmitry Semenovich Geraskin (1911 – 23 September 1943) was a Red Army sergeant during World War II posthumously made a Hero of the Soviet Union.

Biography 
Dmitry Geraskin was born in 1911 in the Monastyrshchino village (now. Kimovsky district, Tula region) in a peasant family. He received an elementary education, after which used to work on the collective farm. In 1941, Geraskin was drafted to serve in the Workers 'and Peasants' Red Army. Since the same year he was drafted to the fronts of the Great Patriotic War. By September 1943, Sergeant Dmitry Geraskin was the commander of the 69th infantry brigade the 9th Infantry Corps of the 3rd Guards Tank Army of the Voronezh Front. He was distinguished during the battle for the Dnieper.
On the night of September 21–22, 1943, Geraskin was one of the first in his division to cross the Dnieper. His division managed to dislodge the enemy from the occupied height, and to defend the crossing of the entire company with machine-gun fire. In the battles on the bridgehead on the western bank of the river, Geraskin's branch destroyed dozens of enemy soldiers and officers. During the subsequent offensive actions during the liberation of villages Zarubintsy, Grigorovka, Lukovitsa, Kanevsky region, Cherkass region of the Ukrainian SSR, his branch destroyed about 50 German soldiers and officers. Geraskin participated in the battles himself. On September 23, 1943, he died in battle. He was buried in a mass grave in the village of Grigorovka.
By the Decree of the Presidium of the USSR Supreme Soviet of November 17, 1943 for "courage, courage and heroism shown in the fight against the German invaders" Sergeant Dmitry Geraskin was posthumously awarded the title of Hero of the Soviet Union with the Order of Lenin.

References

External links
 
 

1911 births
1943 deaths
Soviet military personnel killed in World War II
Recipients of the Order of Lenin
Heroes of the Soviet Union